The Cathedral of Saint Peter is a Roman Catholic cathedral in Kansas City, Kansas, United States and is the seat of the Roman Catholic Archdiocese of Kansas City in Kansas.

History

The Rev. Bernard Kelly was appointed by Bishop Thomas Lillis of the Diocese of Leavenworth to organize St. Peter's parish on October 7, 1907.  The parish's first Mass was held in the Bishop's residence on Sandusky for 126 people on December 8, 1907.  Fund raising began for a combination church and school and the cornerstone for the new building was laid on March 14, 1908.  The facility was dedicated on September 7 of the same year.  A rectory was built from 1916-1917.  Construction began on the current church building in 1925.  The first Mass was celebrated in the building on August 1, 1927 and it was dedicated on September 5 of the same year.  

On May 10, 1947 the See City was transferred from Leavenworth, Kansas to Kansas City by Pope Pius XII.  Bishop George Donnelly consecrated St. Peter's as a cathedral in 1948.  Twelve gold crosses that represent the Twelve Apostles were placed between the Stations of the Cross.  A portable Bishop's throne was placed in the sanctuary.  

A parish center was built in 1992, and the interior of the cathedral was renovated in 1998.  From October 6, 2006 to October 8, 2007 the parish observed its centennial.  A statue of St. Joseph the Worker was placed in the Centennial Courtyard and a time capsule, to be opened in 2057, was buried nearby.

Parochial School
St. Peter's School opened in the fall of 1908 with 95 elementary and 10 high school students.  The combination church and school building became too small and a new structure was built in 1912.  The school had 430 students by 1937.  A fire destroyed the building in 1943.  A new and larger building was dedicated on October 23, 1955.  As the population shifted from the city to the suburbs the enrollment in the school started to decline.  In 2006 there were only 110 students enrolled at St. Peter's.  The archdiocese consolidated the parochial schools in eastern Wyandotte County into Resurrection Catholic School in 2007 using the St. Peter's School building.

Pastors & Rectors

The following priests have served St. Peter's as its pastor.  Since 1947 they have also served as Cathedral Rector:   

Rev. Bernard S. Kelly, 1907-1909
Rev. Bernard Mohan, 1909
Msgr. Patrick McInerney, 1909-1911
Msgr. Francis M. Orr, 1911-1937
Msgr. James P. McKenna, 1938-1966
Very Rev. Leo T. Lutz, 1966-1967
Msgr. J. Kenneth Spurlock, 1967-1983
Very Rev. Thomas Tank, 1983-1986
Msgr. Henry Gardner, 1986-1991
Msgr. William Curtin, 1991-1996
Msgr. Thomas Tank, 1996-2003
Msgr. Gary Applegate, 2003-2005
Msgr. Robert Bergman, 2005 - 2009
Very Rev. Harold Schneider, 2009 – 2019
Very Rev. Oswaldo Sandoval, 2019 - 2020
Very Rev. Anthony J. Saiki, 2020 - Present

See also
List of Catholic cathedrals in the United States
List of cathedrals in the United States

References

External links

Official Cathedral Site
Archdiocese of Kansas City Official Site
Resurrection Catholic School Official Site

 

Churches in the Roman Catholic Archdiocese of Kansas City in Kansas
Peter, St., Kansas City
Churches in Wyandotte County, Kansas
Buildings and structures in Kansas City, Kansas
Gothic Revival church buildings in Kansas
Christian organizations established in 1907
Roman Catholic churches completed in 1927
20th-century Roman Catholic church buildings in the United States